Dichonioxa is a genus of moths of the family Noctuidae.

References

External links
Natural History Museum Lepidoptera genus database

Cuculliinae